Lina Johansson (born 26 September 1988) is a Swedish former competitive figure skater. She is the 2003–04 JGP Final silver medalist, a two-time Nordic medalist, and the 2005 Swedish national champion. She reached the free skate at six ISU Championships – 2003 Junior Worlds in Ostrava, 2004 Junior Worlds in The Hague, 2005 Europeans in Turin, 2005 Worlds in Moscow, 2006 Europeans in Lyon, and 2007 Europeans in Warsaw.

She is the first Swedish skater to qualify for and to medal at the JGP Final. Due to many injuries during her career, she retired from competitive skating in 2007.

Programs

Competitive highlights
GP: Grand Prix; JGP: Junior Grand Prix

References

External links 

 

Swedish female single skaters
Living people
1988 births
Sportspeople from Malmö
21st-century Swedish women